Neoclinus nudiceps is a species of chaenopsid blenny found around Japan in the north-west Pacific Ocean where it is inhabits cavities within rocky areas.

References

nudiceps
Fish described in 2010